Colurella is a genus of rotifers belonging to the family Lepadellidae. The genus has a cosmopolitan distribution

Species
The following species are recognised in the genus Colurella:
 

Colurella adriatica 
Colurella anodonta 
Colurella aquaducti 
Colurella aquaeducti 
Colurella asymmetrica 
Colurella collaris 
Colurella colurus 
Colurella denticauda 
Colurella dicentra 
Colurella geophila 
Colurella halophila 
Colurella hindenburgi 
Colurella marinovi 
Colurella mucronulata 
Colurella oblonga 
Colurella obtusa 
Colurella ovalis 
Colurella oxycauda 
Colurella paludosa 
Colurella psammophila 
Colurella salina 
Colurella sanoamuangae 
Colurella sinistra 
Colurella sulcata 
Colurella tesselata 
Colurella uncinata 
Colurella unicauda 
Colurella unicaudata

References

Rotifer genera
Ploima